Luigi Carlo Borromeo (26 October 1893 – 4 July 1975) was the Italian Bishop of the Roman Catholic Diocese of Pesaro from his appointment by Pope Pius XII on 28 December 1952 until his death on 4 July 1975.

Biography 

Born in Graffignana in 1893, Borromeo was ordained a Catholic priest on 20 March 1918. He was appointed Auxiliary bishop of Lodi on 4 November 1951 and was ordained titular Bishop of Choma on 2 December 1951.

He was appointed bishop of Pesaro on 28 December 1952. He was council father during the four sessions of Second Vatican Council, and in Pesaro, in 1971, he consecrated the new parish dedicated to St. Charles Borromeo.

Bishop Luigi Carlo Borromeo died on 4 July 1975, at the age of 81.

Bibliography 
 Ernestus Preziosi; "La marea che sale…" Mons. Luigi Borromeo vescovo di Pesaro e l’apertura a sinistra; Pisaurum; From: Frammenti. Quaderni per la ricerca, n. 11/2007.

References

External links
Profile of Mons. Borromeo www.catholic-hierarchy.org
Official Page of diocese of Pesaro

1893 births
Bishops and archbishops of Pesaro
20th-century Italian Roman Catholic bishops
1975 deaths
People from the Province of Lodi
Auxiliary bishops of Lodi